Peggy Lynn Johnson (formerly known as Racine County Jane Doe), also known by the last name Schroeder, was an American woman whose body was discovered in 1999 in the town of Raymond, Racine County, Wisconsin. She was 23 years old at the time of her death, which had occurred after enduring several weeks of  extreme neglect and physical abuse. New developments in the case emerged after her body was exhumed on October 16, 2013, including isotope analysis. In November 2019, authorities announced that after two decades she was finally identified. Both the victim's and the murderer's name were released on November 8, 2019. In March 2022, Linda La Roche was convicted of her murder. In May 2022, she was sentenced to life in prison without the possibility of parole. Johnson's murder received national attention both preceding and following her identification.

Discovery

Johnson's body was discovered within the first rows of a cornfield on July 21, 1999, by a father and daughter walking their dogs. The location was along 92nd Street in Raymond, Wisconsin. Her death had occurred within one day prior to the discovery of her body. Johnson's injuries were apparent and her right arm was bent "unnaturally" behind her. Because it had rained on the night her body was dumped, little evidence of the perpetrator was found, although she was placed at the scene about 12 hours prior, before precipitation occurred. The witness stated the body had not been at the location the day before. Based on marks on her body, she appeared to have been dragged 25 feet from the roadside.

She wore a man's shirt, gray in color, with a floral design on the front. After contacting the shirt's manufacturer, it was learned that this type of shirt was first sold in 1984. She was also wearing black sweatpants. No additional clothing was found, including footwear.

Examination
During the autopsy, multiple injuries were observed across her body, and it was determined she had endured several weeks of neglect in addition to long-term physical abuse. She was malnourished and suffered from an untreated infection in her left elbow. The abuse increased in severity in the days immediately prior to her death, and she had also been sexually assaulted. Potential chemical burns were identified on 25% of her body and road rash was also observed. Her nose was broken, as were several of her ribs, although some of the latter injuries occurred after death. A "cauliflower ear" deformity may have been caused by the recent increase of abuse she suffered, either from beating or being pulled. Sharp-force trauma was also evident on the same ear.

Additionally, the examination suggested she may have been a cognitively disabled individual. It was believed that she was most likely 18 to 35 years old. Her front incisors protruded from her mouth, and decay was present on many teeth, some of which were missing. Her curly hair was reddish-brown, collar-length, and appeared to have blond highlights. Johnson's eye color was difficult to discern, but listed as brown, green, or hazel. There were two earrings in each of her ears. Additionally, there was evidence she may have worn glasses, despite their absence from the crime scene.

Investigation

Over 50 people attended Johnson's funeral on October 27, 1999, after the autopsy and other examinations were completed. She was interred at Holy Family Cemetery in Caledonia, Wisconsin. Her gravestone read "Daughter: Jane Doe", along with the dates of discovery and burial, with the phrase "Gone, but not forgotten".

Multiple reconstructions were created of her face to assist with visual identification of the body. In 2012, a revised reconstruction was created by the National Center for Missing and Exploited Children, replacing their original. Another version of this facial composite exists, which depicts a differing facial rendition of how she may have appeared in life.

Police theorized that she was an international visitor, a runaway child or was estranged from her family. In 2011, investigators followed a potential lead that the victim may have been Aundria Bowman (born Alexis Badger), who disappeared from her adoptive parents' house in Hamilton, Michigan on March 11, 1989. DNA profiling, via her mother Cathy, demonstrated that they were not the same person. Additional missing persons such as Tina D'Ambrosio and Karen Wells were ruled out.

Some believed that this case could be linked to the murder of Mary Kate Chamizo (née Sunderlin), a previously unidentified victim who was discovered in Lake County, Illinois. Chamizo was also found malnourished, had poor dentition and had been beaten to death. Three were arrested in that case; one was convicted. All three were later cleared due to new evidence.

Her remains were exhumed on October 16, 2013, for further study and transported to Milwaukee, Wisconsin, where her body had previously been examined in 1999. Authorities hoped that by studying the isotopic makeup of her bones, they would be able to tell where she had lived prior to her death. An anthropologist from Tennessee was employed to conduct the tests.

Although the murder remained unsolved at the time, investigators stated they hoped that the case would eventually come to a close. A press conference in 2013 explained they had uncovered more clues.

It was announced on July 19, 2015, that the examination of her remains had been completed and that they would be reburied on the 16th anniversary of Johnson's discovery. Authorities stated they had indeed uncovered new leads from the exhumation, but they declined to state any details.

On October 20, 2016, it was announced that chemical isotope testing performed by the Smithsonian on a sample of her hair and bone suggested she was potentially from or spent several years of her life in Alaska, Montana or portions of southern Canada. Authorities did not comment on what testing the results were from, whether recent with hair or history from bone. The police department planned on seeking forensic genetic genealogy organizations to identify potential relatives of the victim.

Identification and arrest of Linda La Roche

On November 7, 2019, the Racine County Sheriff's Office announced that Sheriff Christopher Schmaling would hold a media briefing the following day to release information about Racine County Jane Doe's identity and the name of the individual in custody for her death. The announcement stated that "both the victim and the individual in custody have substantial ties to a northwestern Chicago suburb."

On November 8, 2019, Racine County authorities identified the victim, through DNA comparison, as Peggy Lynn Johnson, 23, of McHenry, Illinois. Her accused killer was identified as a 63-year-old nurse, Linda Sue La Roche. La Roche owned her own nursing practice, established in 1997, which provided health care to at least two Illinois correctional facilities, without displaying any questionable or inadequate behavior. Johnson was never reported missing, although an aunt placed a personal ad in a December 1999 issue of Northwest Herald requesting Johnson contact her.

La Roche was arrested on November 5, 2019, in Cape Coral, Florida, where she resided since 2013. The warrant was listed as $1 million. She reportedly confessed to killing someone during her stay in Illinois to various individuals, one of whom alerted police on September 23, 2019. According to a criminal complaint, La Roche was charged with first-degree intentional homicide and concealment of a corpse. Authorities state the maximum penalty would be life in prison. At the time she was charged with murdering Peggy Johnson, she was facing legal proceedings after causing a vehicle accident while intoxicated.

Johnson was reportedly last seen by classmates at a 1994 homecoming dance in Harvard, Illinois. The victim and her accused killer first encountered each other in 1994 at a medical clinic Johnson worked at. She became homeless at age 18 after her mother's death; her brother and father had previously died. Johnson agreed to serve as a housekeeper for La Roche in exchange for room and board. The emotional and physical abuse against Johnson took place over a significant period of time before her death, presumably since moving into the residence. As indicated by the autopsy, she was subjected to a poor living environment and was not well-nourished. Instances of La Roche's abuse toward Johnson were confirmed by her children, one of which the victim confided in after being asked about a bruise to the face.

Despite friends and classmates of Johnson describing her as mild-mannered and "quiet," the suspect claimed the victim repeatedly stole from the residence, including medication, and invited males over without permission. La Roche's now-ex-husband stated he had come home in July 1999 to find Johnson lying unresponsive, which the suspect claimed resulted from an overdose. La Roche admitted to having stored medication in the cellar of their residence, where Johnson was allegedly forced to sleep, and that she witnessed seeing Johnson "faint" after emptying pill containers in their bathroom sink. Johnson allegedly expired after being taken outside for better air quality. La Roche instructed her then-husband to take their children away for an outing so she could dispose of the body. Paramedics were not called and La Roche did not provide medical assistance to the victim, despite her occupation as a nurse. The autopsy of Johnson's body disputed the alleged overdose, as toxicology tests proved negative. La Roche informed her husband upon his return that the victim regained consciousness, after which she gave two different accounts of leaving Johnson with her grandmother or abandoning her, unharmed, along a roadway in Wisconsin. Johnson's grandmother denied ever meeting members of the La Roche family, let alone seeing Johnson on the day in question.

Police explained they planned to exhume Johnson's body once again, and re-inter her next to her mother in Belvidere, Illinois.

Legal proceedings 
La Roche first appeared in court on January 9, 2020, for a preliminary hearing which was adjourned due to the fact that La Roche did not have an attorney. Her trial was initially set for February 2020, but was postponed until April 2021 due to lack of attorney, and then indefinitely due to the COVID-19 pandemic.

The trial commenced in March 2022. On March 16, 2022, La Roche was found guilty of first-degree intentional homicide of Johnson and hiding her corpse. She was sentenced to life imprisonment without the possibility of parole.

See also
Murder of Erika Hill, a case similar to Johnson's.
List of solved missing person cases
List of unsolved murders

References

1990s missing person cases
1999 in Illinois
1999 in Wisconsin
1999 murders in the United States
July 1999 events in the United States
July 1999 crimes
Deaths by beating in the United States
Deaths by person in Illinois
Female murder victims
Formerly missing people
McHenry, Illinois
Incidents of violence against women
Missing person cases in Illinois
People murdered in Illinois
Racine County, Wisconsin
Sexual assaults in the United States
Torture in the United States
Unsolved murders in the United States
Violence against women in the United States
History of women in Illinois